The Cedar Fire may refer to:

 Cedar Fire, an enormous wildfire that burned in San Diego County, California in 2003
 Cedar Fire (2016), a wildfire that burned in Kern County, California in 2016